Edward the Great: The Greatest Hits is Iron Maiden's third "best-of album", originally released on 4 November 2002. Unlike the band's other works by the group collecting together songs from different albums, such as Best of the Beast, Edward the Great does not feature any material from the group's first two albums, which featured Paul Di'Anno as vocalist, but does include material from Blaze Bayley's five-year tenure with the band.

Background
According to Mick Wall, the collection was controversial amongst fans as it was released not long after previous compilations such as Best of the Beast and Ed Hunter. Bassist and founder member Steve Harris comments, "We did get a bit of flak for the Edward the Great album but it wasn't aimed at the hardcore fan, it was aimed at the peripheral people who've heard the name or seen the name on a T-shirt and wouldn't know which record to pick up." To satisfy "the real collector", the band released the Eddie's Archive box set simultaneously.

In 2005, a revised edition was released in Europe, Asia and South-America with an updated track-listing. The new version coincided with the release of The Essential Iron Maiden compilation, released solely in North America, and featured songs from the Dance of Death album as well as an alternate live version of "Fear of the Dark". The updated CD also added the song "Brave New World" from the album of the same name and the booklet included a new foreword by Iron Maiden manager Rod Smallwood, replacing the original foreword by founding member Steve Harris. The album cover does not differentiate between the two editions.

Track listing

Original track listing (2002)

Revised track listing (2005)

Personnel
Production and performance credits are adapted from the album liner notes.
Iron Maiden
Bruce Dickinson – lead vocals (except "Man on the Edge", "Futureal")
Steve Harris – bass guitar, producer ("Man on the Edge", "Futureal"), co-producer ("The Wicker Man", "Fear of the Dark", "Brave New World", "Wildest Dreams", "Rainmaker")
Dave Murray – guitar
Janick Gers – guitar ("Holy Smoke", "Bring Your Daughter... to the Slaughter", "Man on the Edge", "Futureal", "The Wicker Man", "Fear of the Dark", "Brave New World", "Wildest Dreams", "Rainmaker")
Adrian Smith – guitar (except "Holy Smoke", "Bring Your Daughter... to the Slaughter", "Man on the Edge", "Futureal")
Nicko McBrain – drums (except "Run to the Hills", "The Number of the Beast")
Additional musicians
Blaze Bayley – lead vocals ("Man on the Edge", "Futureal")
Clive Burr – drums ("Run to the Hills", "The Number of the Beast")
Production
Martin Birch – producer (except "Man on the Edge", "Futureal", "The Wicker Man", "Fear of the Dark", "Brave New World", "Wildest Dreams", "Rainmaker")
Nigel Green – producer ("Man on the Edge", "Futureal")
Kevin Shirley – producer ("The Wicker Man", "Fear of the Dark", "Brave New World", "Wildest Dreams", "Rainmaker")
Simon Heyworth – remastering (except "Man on the Edge", "Futureal", "The Wicker Man", "Fear of the Dark", "Brave New World", "Wildest Dreams", "Rainmaker"), mastering ("Man on the Edge")
Ronal Whelan – mastering ("Futureal")
George Marino – mastering ("The Wicker Man", "Brave New World", "Fear of the Dark" — 2002 edition)
Tim Young – mastering ("Wildest Dreams", "Rainmaker")
Howie Weinberg – mastering ("Fear of the Dark" — 2005 edition)
Tom Adams – sleeve illustration
Peacock – art direction, design
Dimo Safari – photography
Simon Fowler – photography
Ross Halfin – photography
Rod Smallwood – management
Andy Taylor – management
Merck Mercuriadis – management

Charts

Certifications

References

2002 greatest hits albums
Iron Maiden compilation albums
EMI Records compilation albums
Heavy metal compilation albums